Albert Curtis Clark,  (21 February 1859 – 5 February 1937) was an English classical scholar, who specialised in Latin literature, Cicero, and the New Testament. From 1913 to 1934, he was Corpus Christi Professor of Latin at the University of Oxford. He was also  President of the Classical Association from 1930 to 1931.

Works

References

External links
 

1859 births
1937 deaths
English classical scholars
British classical philologists
British Latinists
New Testament scholars
Corpus Christi Professors of Latin
Presidents of the Classical Association